Arya, also spelled Aarya or Ariya or as Aryo or Ario, is an Indo-Iranian name. The Sanskrit word Arya is a surname and a masculine and feminine  given name, signifying "honorable" or "noble". In India and Iran it is a popular masculine given name and a popular surname. In the historically Indianized country of Cambodia, it is usually a name given to girls. In Indonesia, Arya is also commonly used as a masculine given name, usually in Java, Bali, and other places. In Javanese it becomes Aryo, Ario, or Aryono. It is a common name amongst Hindus and Muslims.

Modern usage 
The 2011 television series Game of Thrones features a character named Arya Stark, increasing the name's popularity among Western audiences. In 2013, BBC News wrote that "the passion and the extreme devotion of fans" had brought about a phenomenon unlike anything related to other popular TV series, manifesting itself in a very broad range of fan labor, such as fan fiction, Game of Thrones-themed burlesque routines, or people naming their children after characters from the series. In 2012, "Arya" was the fastest-rising girl's name in popularity in the United States, jumping from 711th to 413th position. 

It peaked in popularity in the United States in 2019, when it was the 92nd most popular name for newborn girls. It fell to 120th position on the U.S. popularity chart in 2021. The name entered the top 200 most commonly used names for girls born in England and Wales in 2017.

Notable persons

From India 
 Arya Bhatta (476–550), Indian mathematician
 Aditi Arya (born 1993), Indian model
 Aditya Arya, Indian photographer
 Arya (actor) (born 1980), south Indian actor
 Aarya Ambekar (born 1994), Marathi playback singer
 Aarya Babbar (born 1981), Indian actor
 Arya Gopi, Indian Malayalam-language poet
 Arya Rohit, Indian actress
 A. S. Arya, Indian structural engineer
 Anita Arya, Indian politician from the BJP
 Chaudhari Kumbharam Arya (1914–1995), Indian freedom fighter and popular leader
 Ishan Arya, Indian cinematographer and producer
 Mangilal Arya (1918–1992), Indian freedom fighter and social reformer
 Satyadeo Narain Arya, Indian politician from Bihar
 Shraddha Arya, Indian actress from the Telugu film industry
 Shubhavi Arya (born 1998), Indian animator
 S. N. Arya, Indian physician and writer
 S. P. Y. Surendranath Arya, Indian independence activist
 Yashpal Arya, Indian politician from the National Congress

From Indonesia 
 Arya Penangsang, Sultan of Demak (1549–1554)
 Ario Soerjo (1898–1948), murdered Indonesian politician
 Arya Maulana Aldiartama (born 1995), Indonesian badminton player
 I Ngurah Komang Arya (born 1985), Indonesian footballer
 Aryo Danusiri, Indonesian film director
 Aryo Djojohadikusumo, Indonesian politician
 Bima Arya (born 1972), Indonesian politician

From Iran 
Aryo Barzan, an Achaemenid prince who was born in 368 BC and died in 330 BC
Aryandes, satrap of Persian Egypt
Ariamnes, satrap of Cappadocia
Ariyāramna, a minor king in pre-imperial Persia (Pars region) and great-grandfather of Darius I
Ariobarzanes I of Media Atropatene, ruled from 65 BC to 56 BC
Ariobarzanes II of Atropatene, grandson of Ariobarzanes I, king of Media Atropatene from 20 BC to 8 BC
Ariobarzanes I of Cappadocia, king of Cappadocia from 93 BC to ca. 63 or 62 BC
Akram Monfared Arya (born 1946), first Iranian female pilot
Fatemeh Motamed-Arya (born 1961), Iranian actress
Arya Aramnejad (born 1983), Iranian singer
Arya Aziminejad (born 1973), Iranian composer
Arya Nasimi-Shad (born 1999), Iranian swimmer
Ariya Daivari (born 1989), Iranian-American professional wrestler

From other origins 
 Arya Mitra Sharma (born 1959), German doctor
 Chandra Arya, Canadian politician

Fictional characters 
 Arya Dröttningu (later Arya Dröttning), from the Inheritance Cycle book series by Christopher Paolini
 Arya Stark, from George R. R. Martin's A Song of Ice and Fire book series and its television adaptation Game of Thrones

References 

Indian masculine given names
Persian masculine given names
Iranian masculine given names
Indonesian masculine given names
Indian surnames
Persian-language surnames
Indian unisex given names
Persian unisex given names
Indonesian names